Cow Bay is a coastal locality in the Shire of Douglas, Queensland, Australia.

Geography
Hutchinson Creek forms most of the northern boundary. The waters of the Coral Sea form the north eastern boundary and most of the eastern.

References 

Shire of Douglas
Coastline of Queensland
Localities in Queensland